Mara Sapon-Shevin is a professor of inclusive education at Syracuse University.

She is a critic of gifted education and turned down an offer of a place for her daughter in a gifted education program on the grounds that "I would never have wanted to raise a child who thought that she was better or smarter than other people". She is also an advocate against bullying, especially bullying against perceived or actual members of the LGBT community.

Books
Playing Favorites: Gifted Education and the Disruption of Community, 
Because We Can Change the World: A Practical Guide To Building Cooperative, Inclusive Classroom Communities, 
Widening the Circle : The Power of Inclusive Classrooms,

See also
Teaching for social justice

References

External links
What's best for the brightest? - an article on the debate about gifted education, where Mara Sapon-Shevin is quoted
Who's a clever kid, then? - another article on gifted education, citing her

Living people
Year of birth missing (living people)
Syracuse University faculty